Tramagenna is a hamlet southwest of Camelford, Cornwall, England, United Kingdom.

References

Hamlets in Cornwall
Camelford